Frank M. Jones   (August 25, 1858 – February 4, 1936) was a baseball player who played shortstop and outfielder in the Major Leagues for the 1884 Detroit Wolverines.

External links

1858 births
1936 deaths
Major League Baseball shortstops
Detroit Wolverines players
19th-century baseball players
Duluth Jayhawks players
Duluth Freezers players
Baseball players from Illinois